The men's Greco-Roman 120 kilograms is a competition featured at the 2013 World Wrestling Championships, and was held at the László Papp Budapest Sports Arena in Budapest, Hungary on 22 September 2013.

This Greco-Roman wrestling competition consists of a single-elimination tournament, with a repechage used to determine the winner of two bronze medals.

Results
Legend
C — Won by 3 cautions given to the opponent
F — Won by fall

Final

Top half

Bottom half

Repechage

 Amir Aliakbari of Iran originally won the gold medal, but was disqualified after he tested positive for Anabolic steroids. Heiki Nabi was upgraded to the gold medal, Rıza Kayaalp to the silver medal and Johan Eurén was raised to third and took the bronze medal.

References
Results Book, Page 124

Men's Greco-Roman 99 kg